Héctor Adolfo Enrique (born 26 April 1962 in Lanús) is a retired Argentine footballer who played as a midfielder, and who was assistant coach of the Argentina national team. He played for La Seleccion in the 1986 World Cup and in Copa América 1989, winning the former competition.

He is currently assistant coach at Al-Wasl club of UAE Arabian Gulf League.

Career

Nicknamed El Negro by both press and fans, Enrique began his playing career in 1982 with 2nd division side Club Atlético Lanús, in 1983 he joined Club Atlético River Plate where he played between 1983 and 1990. His Golden Year was 1986, when he won the 1985–86 Primera División Argentina, Copa Libertadores and Intercontinental Cup. For Argentina he was a vital part of the squad that won the 1986 World Cup.

Enrique was the last man to touch the ball when inside the Argentine half he passed it to Diego Maradona, who would then score what became known as the Goal of the Century. After the game, he jokingly suggested that his pass was so good, it would have been difficult for Maradona not to score. This joke would then become popular in Argentina, often mentioned by players involved in popular goals.

A serious knee injury prevented him from playing in the 1990 World Cup.

Personal life
Enrique played alongside his brother Carlos at River (1988–1990) and at their home town club Lanús (1992–1993). He also played for Deportivo Español in Argentina and Tosu Futures and FPI Hamamatsu in Japan. His sons, Ramiro and Fernando, also played football professionally; while other son, Facundo, played rugby.

Politically, Enrique has been a staunch supporter of former Argentine president Cristina Fernández de Kirchner.

Honours

Club
River Plate
 Primera División: 1985–86, 1989–90
 Intercontinental Cup: 1986
 Copa Libertadores: 1986
 Copa Interamericana: 1986

International
Argentina
 FIFA World Cup: 1986

References

External links

1962 births
Living people
Sportspeople from Lanús
Argentine footballers
Argentine expatriate footballers
Club Atlético Lanús footballers
Club Atlético River Plate footballers
Deportivo Español footballers
1986 FIFA World Cup players
1989 Copa América players
Copa Libertadores-winning players
FIFA World Cup-winning players
Argentina international footballers
Expatriate footballers in Japan
Argentine Primera División players
Association football midfielders
Enrique family